Clarmallagh is a barony in County Laois (formerly called Queen's County or County Leix), Republic of Ireland.

Etymology
Clarmallagh means "Flat land of Maigh Locha [lake plain]", referring to Grantstown Lake.

Geography
Clarmallagh is located in south County Laois, to the south of the River Gully, and to the north of the County Kilkenny border. It contains the lower part of the Erkina River where it drains into the River Nore.

History

Clarmallagh barony was anciently the northernmost part of the Kingdom of Osraige (Ossory). 

In the early 12th century, Finn Ua Caellaide ruled Magh Locha (Clarmallagh) separately from the rest of Ossory.

It was ruled by the Ó Faoláin (Phelan).

It is referred to in the topographical poem Tuilleadh feasa ar Éirinn óigh (Giolla na Naomh Ó hUidhrín, d. 1420): 
I Muiġ Laċa na learg te
Ó Faoláin, fearḋa an fíne
Mór an dúthaiġ as díol dáiḃ
Do lín futha Ó Faoláin
("In Magh Lacha of the warm hill slopes is Ó Faolain of manly tribe; Extensive is the district due to them, which the Ó Faolains have filled.")

Clarmallagh was formerly a part of the Upper Ossory barony, established by 1657; in 1842 it was divided into three cantreds: Upper Woods, Clandonagh and Clarmallagh.

List of settlements

Below is a list of settlements in Clarmallagh barony:
Abbeyleix
Ballacolla
Durrow

References

Baronies of County Laois